Yoky Matsuoka (松岡陽子 Matsuoka Yōko, born c. 1972 in Japan) is the CEO and Founder of Yohana (an independent subsidiary of Panasonic). She was the CTO of Google Nest, a co-founder of Google X and previously held roles as VP of Technology and Analytics at Twitter, technology executive at Apple, and as VP of Technology at Nest.

Previously, she was an assistant professor of computer science at Carnegie Mellon University and an associate professor of computer science at the University of Washington, director of Washington's Neurobotics Laboratory, director of the Center for Sensorimotor Neural Engineering. 
She is a 2007 MacArthur Fellow.  At University of Washington, her research combined neuroscience and robotics—sometimes referred to by Matsuoka by the portmanteau neurobotics—to create more realistic prosthetics.

Early life and education
Matsuoka was born in Japan and moved to California at the age of 16. 
In her youth, she was a semi-professional tennis player, once ranking 21st in Japan, but was eventually sidelined by injuries (she broke her ankle for the third time); her interest in robotics began with the idea of a robotic tennis player, which she later decided was unrealistic.

She received her B.S. degree in 1993 from the University of California, Berkeley and an M.S. (1995) and PhD (1998) in electrical engineering and computer science from MIT.

Career
Outside academia, she was chief engineer at Barrett Technology in 1995 and 1996 where she developed the microcode for the BarrettHand. From 2001 to 2006, Yoky was an assistant professor at Carnegie Mellon University. During this time, she held the Anna Loomis McCandless Faculty Chair (from 2004), received a Presidential Early Career Award for Scientists and Engineers (2004) and an IEEE Early Career Award in Robotics and Automation (2005), and was nominated for the MacArthur Fellowship (2006), winning and joining the class of 2007. She continued her career at the University of Washington as an associate professor, and is currently working for Apple on wellness related products.

Research
Matthew O'Donnell, dean of the Washington College of Engineering characterizes her as "a mechanical engineer, neuroscientist, bioengineer, robotics expert and computer scientist, all in one… [with] …the ability to see what is possible by combining all these disciplines." The MacArthur Foundation characterizes her work as "transforming our understanding of how the central nervous system coordinates musculoskeletal action and of how robotic technology can enhance the mobility of people with manipulation disabilities.

Industry

In 2011, she joined Google X as one of its three founding members. There she helped on-boarding Babak Parviz (who led the Google Glass team) and developed Google X's portfolio in medical space. She then joined Nest as VP of Technology, in charge of machine learning and UX. There she led the development of the adaptive component of the Nest Thermostat, which is a key component of the product to date. Currently, she is an advisor to Brain of Things, that provides a home that learns.  In 2015 she left for Apple and worked there until Dec 2016 on Apple's HealthKit tracking software, the CareKit tool for managing patient medical care, and the ResearchKit framework. She was the Chief Technology Officer at Nest until they were acquired by Google. Currently, she is the founder and CEO of Yo Labs.

Personal life
She is married to a computer vision specialist and has four children.

Notes

External links
 Official page at the University of Washington
 Microsoft Research, Understanding Human Movements to Enhance HCI Environments, Research Channel, September 29, 2005, 1:18:20 video about Matsuoka
 Neurobotics Laboratory, archived site of her Neurobiotics Laboratory at CMU.
 UW Neurobotics Laboratory, archived site for UW Neurobotics Laboratory
 Neuralengineering Center, nascent Pacific Northwest research collaboration center
 Yoky Matsuoka on the site of the MacArthur Foundation.

1970s births
Living people
American computer scientists
American academics of Japanese descent
American electrical engineers
Apple Inc. employees
MIT School of Engineering alumni
University of California, Berkeley alumni
University of Washington faculty
Japanese emigrants to the United States
MacArthur Fellows
American roboticists
Carnegie Mellon University faculty